Đorđe Todorović (born 1991) is a politician in Serbia. He was elected to the National Assembly of Serbia in the 2020 parliamentary election as a member of the Serbian Progressive Party.

Private career
Todorović was born in Belgrade, Serbia, in what was then the Socialist Federal Republic of Yugoslavia. He is an engineer of organizational sciences and lives in the Belgrade municipality of Palilula.

Politician

Municipal politics
Todorovič appeared in the nineteenth position on the Progressive Party's electoral list for Palilula's municipal assembly in the 2016 Serbian local elections and received a mandate when the list won twenty-seven seats. He did not seek re-election in 2020. He was described in a February 2020 article as a student in the party's Academy of Young Leaders program.

Parliamentarian
Todorović was given the sixth position on the party's Aleksandar Vučić — For Our Children list for the 2020 Serbian parliamentary election. This was tantamount to election, and he was indeed elected to the assembly when the list won a landslide majority with 188 mandates. He is a member of the assembly's foreign affairs committee; a deputy member of the committee on constitutional and legislative issues, the defence and internal affairs committee, and the committee on Kosovo–Metohija; a member of Serbia's delegation to the parliamentary assembly of the Collective Security Treaty Organization; the leader of Serbia's parliamentary friendship group with Lebanon; and a member of the parliamentary friendship groups with Armenia, the Bahamas, Belarus, Botswana, Brazil, Cameroon, the Central African Republic, China, Comoros, Cuba, the Dominican Republic, Ecuador, Equatorial Guinea, Eritrea, Grenada, Guinea-Bissau, Iceland, India, Iran, Israel, Jamaica, Japan, Kazakhstan, Kyrgyzstan, Laos, Liberia, Madagascar, Mali, Mauritius, Mozambique, Nauru, Nicaragua, Nigeria, Palau, Papua New Guinea, Paraguay, the Republic of Congo, Russia, Saint Vincent and the Grenadines, Sao Tome and Principe, the Solomon Islands, South Sudan, Sri Lanka, Sudan, Suriname, Togo, Trinidad and Tobago, the United Arab Emirates, the United States of America, Uruguay, Uzbekistan, and Venezuela.

Todorović criticized the media outlets N1 and Nova S during a legislative debate in December 2020, charging them with being "anti-state" and saying that they were "slowly becoming political parties."

References

1991 births
Living people
Politicians from Belgrade
Members of the National Assembly (Serbia)
Members of the Parliamentary Assembly of the Collective Security Treaty Organization
Serbian Progressive Party politicians